Rubi Industria de Cremalleras is one of the oldest companies engaged in the manufacture of zippers.

History

Cremalleras Rubi was founded in 1926 in the town of Rubí, Barcelona, which still maintains its headquarters and single plant. 

In the 30s, the British company Imperial Metallurgic Industries (IMI) bought the company and, having no experience in the market of the zippers, partnered with one of the European leaders in the industry, the German manufacturer Opti.

The company remained in front of the European market until the late seventies. The Spanish subsidiary defaulted in 1981 and, four years later, bought their 256 employees making it a labor corporation (SAL). The company, which in 1996 regained name Rubi Industria de Cremalleras, is already a conventional corporation, but “in spirit” remains in the hands of its workers.

References

External links
 "01/2013-Cremalleras Rubí, una histórica que sigue abrochando..." —  Moda.es
 "01/2004-Cremalleras Rubí se abre al exterior." —  Diario de Córdoba
 "Rubí Star, la nueva estrella de Cremalleras Rubí." —  Técnica del Calzado
 "Cremalleras Rubí lanza un nuevo concepto de producto." —  Mercería Actualidad

Manufacturing companies based in Barcelona